Åsbo can refer to:

Åsbo Northern Hundred, a hundred in Scania
Åsbo Southern Hundred, a hundred in Scania